Matale Vijaya College (Sinhala: විජය විද්‍යාලය), or (VCM) is a "Buddhist College" situated in matale city center, A9 highway main road. It is the oldest buddhist college in, matale district. Vijaya College was founded in 1886 by Henry Steel Olcott

History 
In 1886 Sir Henry Steel Olcott, Stephen Silva, Sir Don Baron Jayatilaka, A. D. S. Wickramasekara, and Prof. Batuwantudawe founded the school. They wished to renew Buddhist culture in Sri Lanka. Alongside the Matale Ubaya Lokarth Society, the new school was initially known as the Buddhist Institute Boys school.

Shroff Ratwatte donated land at Hetti Vediya, Matale including a thatched building. The first principal was Godawela. The initial enrollment was 150 students. This school was later moved to a building at Gongawela in 1889 with the help of the Parama Vidyartha Buddhist Society. 

Between 1888 and 1912, Prof. Batuwantudawe, Shumawa, Francis Soysa, Weerasinghe, and D. S. de Silva served as principals, with M. B. Navaratne, A. D. William Silva, W. A. M. Peiris Silva, and D. P. Wanigasekara serving for the following 10 years. From 1922 to 1951, the principal was Karaliyadda and V. T. Nanayakkara.

From 1922 to 1931, V. B. Karaliyadde served as principal, and by 1923 the school building was brought to its present location. On the guidance of Karaliyadde, Hulanganuwa Rate Mahattaya and Sediyas Silva bought and donated the present land to Vijaya College. From 1931 to 1951, Nanayakkara served as the principal expanding the buildings. 

On 23 March 1938, the school was renamed to Vijaya College by then principal, V. T. Nanayakkara. 

Gunasena Hall was built by the J. E. Gunasena in 1947 and donated to the school. Sports were introduced at that time.

Houses
Mahinda - 
Nalanda - 
Ananda - 
Dharmaraja -

Enrollment
As of July 2020, more than 3,500 students studied at the college. The curriculum included grade 5 scholarship exams, O/L and A/L.

Vijaya Sevens 
The Vijaya Sevens national hockey tournament is organized every year. The Vijaya Sevens Old Vijayans Challenge Trophy event began in 1999. The match is played at Bernard Aluvihara Stadium and Edward Park Hockey Stadium in association with the college.

This match is open to all island hockey clubs affiliated with the Sri Lanka Hockey Federation. These competitions are held in the league and knockout format. The nation's leading sports clubs such as the Sri Lanka Army, Sri Lanka Navy, Sri Lanka Air Force, and Sri Lanka Police and School Sports Clubs join the competition.

The official theme song for the Challenge Trophy is "Vijaya Sarade", created in 2015. The song was written by Danushka Kumarathunga and composed by Krishantha Premachandra.

Notable alumni

References

External links

Schools in Matale
1886 establishments in Ceylon
Educational institutions established in 1886